Jasmine Hutton (born 5 April 1999 in Brighton) is an English professional squash player. As of December 2022 she was ranked number 23 in the world.

Career
In 2022, Hutton won the women's singles at the British National Squash Championships. Later that year, she won a bronze at the 2022 Women's World Team Squash Championships.

References

1999 births
Living people
English female squash players